The following is the list of squads that took place in the men's field hockey tournament at the 1988 Summer Olympics.

Group A

Argentina
The following players represented Argentina:

 Otto Schmitt
 Alejandro Siri
 Miguel Altube
 Marcelo Mascheroni
 Marcelo Garrafo
 Edgardo Pailos
 Alejandro Doherty
 Aldo Ayala
 Carlos Geneyro
 Gabriel Minadeo
 Alejandro Verga
 Fernando Ferrara
 Emanuel Roggero
 Franco Nicola
 Martín Sordelli
 Mariano Silva

Australia
The following players represented Australia:

 Craig Davies
 Colin Batch
 John Bestall
 Warren Birmingham
 Ric Charlesworth
 Andrew Deane
 Michael York
 Mark Hager
 Jay Stacy
 Neil Hawgood
 Peter Noel
 Graham Reid
 Roger Smith
 Neil Snowden
 David Wansbrough
 Ken Wark

Kenya
The following players represented Kenya:

 Paul Sewe Omany
 Parminder Singh Saini
 Roy Odhier
 Charles Oguk
 John Eliud Okoth
 Michael Omondi
 Samuel Ngoyo
 Peter Akatsa
 Sanjiwan Goyal
 Christopher Otambo
 Lucas Alubaha
 Victor Owino
 Samson Oriso
 Inderjit Singh Matharu
 Samson Muange
 Julius Mutinda

Netherlands
The following players represented the Netherlands:

 Frank Leistra
 Marc Benninga
 Cees Jan Diepeveen
 Maurits Crucq
 René Klaassen
 Hendrik Jan Kooijman
 Marc Delissen
 Jacques Brinkman
 Gert Jan Schlatmann
 Tim Steens
 Floris Jan Bovelander
 Patrick Faber
 Ronald Jansen
 Hidde Kruize
 Erik Parlevliet
 Taco van den Honert

Pakistan
The following players represented Pakistan:

 Mansoor Ahmed
 Nasir Ali
 Qazi Mohib
 Amir Zafar
 Ishtiaq Ahmed
 Naeem Akhtar
 Muhammad Qamar Ibrahim
 Shahbaz Ahmed
 Tariq Sheikh
 Zahid Sharif
 Khalid Hamid
 Khalid Bashir
 Naeem Amjad
 Tahir Zaman
 Musaddiq Hussain

Spain
The following players represented Spain:

 Miguel Rovira
 Ignacio Escudé
 Kim Malgosa
 Andrés Gómez
 Juantxo García-Mauriño
 Jaime Armengold
 Juan Carlos Peón
 Juan Malgosa
 Jaime Escudé
 Xavier Escudé
 Jordi Oliva
 Miguel Ortego
 Miguel de Paz
 Eduardo Fábregas
 José Antonio Iglesias
 Santiago Grau

Group B

Canada
The following players represented Canada:

 Ross Rutledge
 Nick Sandhu
 Rick Albert
 Patrick Burrows
 Paul Chohan
 Chris Gifford
 Wayne Grimmer
 Ranjit Rai
 Peter Milkovich
 Trevor Porritt
 Ian Bird
 Doug Harris
 Michael Muller
 Pat Caruso
 Ajay Dubé
 Ken Goodwin

Great Britain
The following players represented Great Britain:

 Ian Taylor
 Veryan Pappin
 David Faulkner
 Paul Barber
 Stephen Martin
 Jon Potter
 Richard Dodds
 Martyn Grimley
 Steve Batchelor
 Richard Leman
 Jimmy Kirkwood
 Kulbir Bhaura
 Sean Kerly
 Robert Clift
 Imran Sherwani
 Russell Garcia

India
The following players represented India:

 Rajinder Singh Rawat
 Pargat Singh
 Ashok Kumar
 Mohinder Pal Singh
 Somaya Muttana Maneypandey
 Vivek Singh
 Sujit Kumar
 Subramani Balada Kalaiah
 Mohammed Shahid
 Jude Sebastian
 Balwinder Singh
 Merwyn Fernandis
 Thoiba Singh
 Gundeep Kumar
 Jagbir Singh
 Mark Patterson

South Korea
The following players represented South Korea:

 Song Seok-chan
 Kim Yeong-jun
 Kim Jong-gap
 Jeong Bu-jin
 Jeong Gye-seok
 Kim Jae-cheon
 Kwon Sun-pil
 Mo Ji-yeong
 Ji Jae-gwan
 Kim Man-hoe
 Han Jin-su
 Lee Heung-pyo
 Heo Sang-nyeong
 Park Jae-sik
 Yu Seung-jin
 Sin Seok-gyun

Soviet Union
The following players represented the Soviet Union:

 Vladimir Pleshakov
 Viktor Deputatov
 Igor Yulchiyev
 Sos Hayrapetyan
 Vladimir Antakov
 Vyacheslav Chechenev
 Igor Atanov
 Sergey Shakhvorostov
 Sergei Pleshakov
 Mikhail Nichepurenko
 Aleksandr Domashev
 Igor Davydov
 Aleksandr Myasnikov
 Yevgeny Nechayev
 Mikhail Bukatin

West Germany
The following players represented West Germany:

 Christian Schliemann
 Tobias Frank
 Horst-Ulrich Hänel
 Carsten Fischer
 Andreas Mollandin
 Ekkhard Schmidt-Opper
 Dirk Brinkmann
 Heiner Dopp
 Stefan Blöcher
 Andreas Keller
 Thomas Reck
 Thomas Brinkmann
 Hanns-Henning Fastrich
 Michael Hilgers
 Volker Fried
 Michael Metz

References

1988